is a Japanese role-playing video game developed by TOSE and published by Konami for the Game Boy Color. It is the sixteenth main entry in the Goemon series. Unlike most games in the series, this game is actually a role-playing game, a genre which was used first in the Ganbare Goemon Gaiden games for the Famicom. The game also borrows some concepts from the franchise's anime series.

The protagonist in the game is a boy named Hiroshi, who somehow gets transported into a Ganbare Goemon game and teams with Goemon in order to save Japan from some evil force.

References

1999 video games
Game Boy Color games
Game Boy Color-only games
Ganbare Goemon games
Japan-exclusive video games
Japanese role-playing video games
Tose (company) games
Video games about time travel
Video games developed in Japan

Single-player video games